Kushkaran (Quşqaran) is a rural locality (a village) in Kyzyl-Yarsky Selsoviet, Yermekeyevsky District, Bashkortostan, Russia. The population was 74 as of 2010. There is one street.

Geography 
Kushkaran is located 18 km northwest of Yermekeyevo (the district's administrative centre) by road. Kyzyl-Yar is the nearest rural locality.

References 

Rural localities in Yermekeyevsky District